Suvdyn Tuul (born 17 September 1970) is a Mongolian archer.

Archery

Tuul finished 24th at the 1988 Summer Olympic Games in the women's individual event. In the women's team event she finished twelfth as a member of the Mongolian team.

References

External links
 
 Profile on worldarchery.org

1970 births
Living people
Mongolian female archers
Olympic archers of Mongolia
Archers at the 1988 Summer Olympics
20th-century Mongolian women